Burton is a locality in the Isaac Region, Queensland, Australia.

Geography 
Burton sits on a major coal deposit in the Bowen Basin. There are a number of coal mines operating there (and beyond into adjacent localities), including Burton Coal Mine (including Burton, Broadmeadow, Wallanbah pits), Lancewood, Wards Well, West Burton, New Lenton, Kerlong, Burton, Plumtree, Ironbark No 1, and Talwood. The Goonyella railway line provides transport from the mines to the ports.

History 
The locality was named and bounded on 12 March 1999.

References 

Isaac Region
Coal mining regions in Australia
Localities in Queensland